Courtney Fink is an American organizer, arts advocate, curator and writer. She is the co-Founder and Director of Common Field, a national network of art spaces and projects. Courtney Fink currently serves as a board member for the Andy Warhol Foundation for the Visual Arts.

From 2003–2015 she served as the Executive Director of Southern Exposure, a non-profit alternative art space in San Francisco, California. While at Southern Exposure she pioneered the Alternative Exposure granting program which distributed funds to alternative spaces and artists projects throughout San Francisco and the Bay Area.

Courtney Fink holds a B.A. degree in art history and fine arts from Skidmore College in Saratoga Springs, New York.

References

External links 
 

Living people
Artists from Los Angeles
Writers from Los Angeles
Skidmore College alumni
Year of birth missing (living people)
Place of birth missing (living people)
American company founders
American women company founders
American art curators
American women curators
21st-century American women